Jose Morey is a Puerto Rican physician. He is the founder and chief executive officer of Ad Astra Media.

Morey is known as an intergalactic doctor. He has served as an associate professor of radiology and internal medicine at Eastern Virginia Medical School.

He is an Eisenhower Fellow.

Early life and education 
Morey was born into a Puerto Rican family.

He received his medical degree from the University of South Florida Morsani College of Medicine. Later, he studied at Johns Hopkins School of Medicine. He did his fellowship from the University of Pennsylvania.

Career 
Morey started his career as a radiologist in Eastern Virginia. Later, he joined University of Virginia’s radiology department as an assistant professor of radiology and biomedical imaging. He has also served as a director of informatics for Medical Center Radiologists in Virginia Beach, Virginia.

Morey has made a name for himself throughout the scientific community for being a leader in the innovation of biotechnology, AI applications, and aerospace. He is frequently featured in publications and television including Univision, CNBC, and NASA360. He is a keynote speaker, novelist, writer (featured in the Wall Street Journal and previously writing for Forbes Technology Council), and consultant. Notably, Morey has deemed Puerto Rico the potential, "Silicon Island," citing increased interest and opportunities in STEM fields from a growing tech industry, that Morey considers necessary for a transformation into an economic leader. 

Morey has served as chief medical innovation officer of Liberty BioSecurity. He has also served as an advisor to MIT Solve and NASA iTech.

He formerly was an associate chief health officer for IBM Watson.

Morey is an Eisenhower Fellow with the 2020-2021 Zhi-Xing Fellows Program.

He is also a faculty member of the Singularity University.

Morey has had the honor of sitting on several nationally recognized medical and STEAM related boards. Statewide, he is on the board with the Medical Society of Virginia and features as a guest speaker, the Informatics Leadership Council of the American College of Radiology, Virginia Chapter, and Virginia Health Information (VHI). He is on the advisory boards for MIT Solve, a platform for social impact, and MIT Ideas, a yearly social impact competition for MIT students, SciTech, a nonprofit for aerospace research, and the National STEM Honor Society.  Further boards Morey features on include: SOMOS Inc., Immertec, Predictiv Care, Cemvita Factory, MaaPaa Organization, and the WHRO Board of Directors. He is a cofounder and currently sits as Chief Health Officer of Ever Medical Technologies; and, in 2021, helped to launch Ever Healthcare, their online medical outreach platform, in Thailand.

Additionally, Morey has served as a business advisor and works closely with a variety of international institutions, including:

 Tampa Bay Waves: A Florida based nonprofit for tech startups
 The African Innovation Alliance: who are transforming the African continent's economic growth through creative integrations of developmental and space-level technology
 I-Corps Puerto Rico: A group of researchers and engineers developing new tech businesses
 US Polish Alliance for Innovation: A nonprofit based on professionals representing the fields of science, culture, and business to build relations between the two nations.
 United Nations World Food Program: The world's largest humanitarian organization using food security to build peace, stability, and prosperity
As a member of the Chief Engineering Council for Hyperloop Transportation Technologies, Morey directs engineering technologists to design and develop new properties, including the world's first augmented reality train windows. 

Morey is an advisor for NASA iTech, developing technologies and AI to be used towards the 2030 Mars Mission and the NASA Space Breathing Initiative. He has directed international teams of engineers to develop a database with NASA and NetApp for rapid COVID-19 response measures, now integrated into the US National Emergency Broadcast System. They have programmed AI to determine the best medical procedures in combatting and treating COVID-19. Morey has also served as a representative of the Polish Space Agency.

Morey has served as an advisor to the Director of the White House Office of Science and Technology on their Kaggle CORD19 Project, in collaboration with high-ranking research universities, foundations, Microsoft, and the National Library of Medicine (NLM). Morey aided these parties in the development of an AI platform to analyze material on the Coronavirus family and COVID-19 pandemic.  

In 2021, his novel, LatinX Business Success, co-authored with Frank Carbajal (president of Es Tiempo LLC), was released by Wiley Publishing, and became a #1 seller on Amazon.

Publications 
 The Future Shock of Medicine: How AI will Transform Disease, Death and Doctors
 Biofilms-Impacts on Human Health and Its Relevance to Space Travel
 Machine Learning in Radiology: Applications Beyond Image Interpretation
 Radiology's Emerging Role in 3-D Printing Applications in Health Care
 Latinx Business Success: How Latinx Ingenuity, Innovation, and Tenacity are Driving Some of the World's Biggest Companies

Personal Business 
Morey is known as the first intergalactic doctor, and in 2019, Morey founded and became CEO of Ad Astra Media LLC in Virginia. The company focuses on providing role models to kids in underserved communities, and creating STEAM (Science, Technology, Engineering, Arts, and Mathematics) content to encourage diversity and inspire future innovators in these fields. The company has currently released nine books in four languages and has an ongoing comic series in which Morey stars as Doctor Intergalactic himself. 

Ad Astra Media has partnered with a number of global businesses and foundations. Ad Astra maintains a partnership with the PAST Foundation to produce educational modules and co-created two books in 2022: Good Night Little Computer Programmer and Good Night Little Mining Engineer. They also work with their local PBS and WHRO stations to build content. and have been certified by the Space Foundation in education.

References

External links
 Jose Morey Interview

Puerto Rican physicians
Puerto Rican business executives
University of South Florida alumni
Year of birth missing (living people)
Living people